The knockout stage of the 1982 FIFA World Cup was the final stage of the final tournament, following the second round group stage. It consisted of two semi-final matches, a third-place match played between the two losing teams of the semi-finals, and the final to determine the winners of the competition. Four teams qualified themselves for this final stage by winning the four second round groups: Poland (winners of Group A), West Germany (Group B), Italy, (Group C) and France (Group D).

In the knockout stage, if a match was level at the end of 90 minutes, extra time of two periods (15 minutes each) would be played. In all matches except the final, if the score was still level after extra time, the match would be decided by a penalty shootout. Should the final be level after extra time, the match would instead be replayed.

Qualified teams
The top placed team from each of the four groups of the second round qualified for the knockout stage.

Bracket

Semi-finals

Poland vs Italy

West Germany vs France

Third-place play-off
This was the first in what is going to be 11 consecutive World Cups in which European teams finished third.

Final

References

External links
 1982 FIFA World Cup archive
 Spain 1982 FIFA Technical Report: Statistical Details of the Matches pp. 150-158

Knockout stage
1982
Knockout stage
Knockout stage
Knockout stage
Knockout stage